KENW-FM (89.5 FM) is a radio station broadcasting a public radio format. Licensed to Portales, New Mexico, United States, the station is currently owned by Eastern New Mexico University.

Translators 
In addition to the main station, KENW-FM is simulcasted on 4 full powered stations and 10 low-powered translators to widen its broadcast area.

Full powered stations

Low-powered translators

References

External links 

Eastern New Mexico University
NPR member stations
ENW-FM
Radio stations established in 1979
1979 establishments in New Mexico